Princess Yoshiko (28 October 1804 – 27 January 1893) was the younger sister of Prince Tsunahito of the Arisugawa-no-miya cadet branch of the Imperial House of Japan. Yoshiko was married to Tokugawa Nariaki, and was mother to the 10th Lord Yoshiatsu, and the 15th and final Tokugawa shogun, Tokugawa Yoshinobu.

Personal history 

Yoshiko, the twelfth and youngest daughter of Prince Taruhito of the Arisugawa-no-miya family, was born of the union of her father and the courtesan Ando Kiyoko. She was called  as a child.  She later moved to Edo from Kyoto, where her husband renamed her  in case she were to be widowed. Upon her death, she was given the posthumous name . She died in 1893 at the age of 88 in Tokyo. Tokugawa Yoshiko rests at the Zuiryusan temple, the official Bodhi temple of the Mito clan in Ibaraki Prefecture.

In 1830, at the age of 27, Yoshiko was engaged to Nariaki, who was 37 but had not yet had his first wife as he had become the head of his clan just the year before. Princess Takako was said to have arranged the marriage, and Emperor Ninkō was recorded as having issued an approving comment on the political and educational pedigrees of the Mito branch of the Tokugawa clan. The Mito branch was further renowned for having enthusiastically supported the imperial system for generations, and the emperor gladly approved of the marriage.

When Yoshiko moved to Edo and started leading the life of a samurai wife, she kept the attire of the imperial household for weeks after her marriage. In a letterbox with that portrait, Nariaki called his wife Yoshiko, instead Princess Yoshiko or other names. Among Nariaki's 37 children with four wives, Yoshiko was the mother of his first son, Yoshiatsu, his seventh son, Yoshinobu, and finally a daughter. A fourth child, born before Yoshinobu, died prematurely.

Yoshiko was known to be fluent in the arts, particularly  poems, as well as Japanese calligraphy and the Arisugawa family heritage. After relocating to Mito from Edo, she learned to fish at the river by the castle.

Being an imperial princess and a sister-in-law of the twelfth shogun, Ieyoshi, high-ranking officials including Ii Naosuke and his followers in the Edo government were said to surveil her in case she advised either the shogun or the emperor on political issues. After Nariaki was charged during the Ansei Purge for taking part in anti-shogun movements and detained in Mito for life in 1859, it took her three months to obtain permission and move from Edo to Mito.

Later life 

Between 1869 and 1873 (second and sixth years of Meiji), Yoshiko resided in the Kobuntei Villa in Kairaku-en garden, which her late husband opened. While the samurai custom prohibited Yoshiko from living with her only surviving natural son, Yoshinobu, they did exchange letters. Yoshinobu had been adopted to the Hitotsubashi family when he was eleven  to be entitled as an heir to the shogunate so that he was no longer regarded as Yoshiko's "direct family".

It took years for Yoshiko to overcome the prejudice among Meiji politicians as being anti-government, and for being the mother of Yoshinobu who had opened fire against the government supporters in Kyoto. Additionally, the Mito clan was radically against opening the country to foreign relations and trades. As the emperor governed the Meiji government, Yoshiko had been distanced from her kin in Kyoto before she regained family ties with her grand nephew Prince Taruhito of the Arisugawa family (ja) (1835 – 1895). After she moved to Tokyo, Prince Taruhito wrote in his diary that after January 1873, Yoshiko invited the Prince to her residence and sent gifts when she heard Taruhito was ill and also when the engagement of Prince Taruhito was publicized in June 1873.

When Prince Taruhito lost his first wife Sadako to illness in 1872, Yoshiko mourned the death of her stepdaughter. She offered condolences, arranging an extended family reunion of the children of Nariaki for the deceased, with Prince Taruhito as the guest of honor. The eldest surviving son, Ikeda Yoshinori (ja), who was the lord of Tottori domain, offered his residence, inviting Akitake (Sadako's natural brother), Atsuyoshi (Yoshiatsu's son), Matsudaira Tadakazu (Shimabara domain), Tsuchiya Tsugunao (Tsuchiura domain) among others. Princess Ei, the wife of Akitake, who was Taruhito's pupil of calligraphy, joined them.

Madam Bummei, her posthumous name, was given by her husband Nariaki before his death.

See also 

 Arisugawa family
Mito domain
Tokugawa Yoshinobu

Further reading 

Kawakita, Nobuo (May, 1970) Matsudaira Shungaku no shoko kaigi seijiron no saiyo : kokuze kettei hosaku o chushin ni, "Shigaku" 43 (1), Keio University. pp. 307–318.  . , .
Hattori, Kazuma, Ishii, Takashi (1973) The Opening of Japan, Socio-economic History 39 (3), the Socio-economic History Society. pp. 323–326.  , .
Yamakawa, Kikue. 1991. Oboegaki bakumatsu no Mito-han. Tōkyō: Iwanami shoten. 
 Yamakawa, Kikue 1992. "Women of the Mito domain: recollections of samurai family life". and Kate Wildman Nakai. (trans.). Tokyo : University of Tokyo Press. . , 
 Kindai eno akebono to kuge daimyō [Aristocrats and Daimyo at the Dawn of Modern Age]. Artifacts Exhibition Committee, Okubo Toshikane, et al. (ed), (1994). No.18, "Kasumi Kaikan Shiryo". 

 Exhibition catalogs
 Tokugawa, Yoshinobu - exhibition booklet (1998)
 Tojō Rekishikan 1992. Shōgun no fotogurafī. FREE (ed), Matsudo : Tojo Rekishikan Museum.  An exhibition catalog.
Saigo no shōgun Tokugawa Yoshinobu: Matsudo shisei shikō 55-shūnen, Meiji 130-shūnen kinen. Matsudo-shi Tojō Rekishikan, Matsudo-shi (Japan), Matsudo-shi Kyōiku Iinkai, and JAC Project (eds.). 1998. Matsudo: Matsudo-shi Tojō Rekishikan.  - A catalog for the special exhibition : the reconstructed Messengers' Room and Attendants' Room in the Tojō-tei mansion. Sponsored by Matsudo City and Matsudo Board of Education, held at Matsudo-shi Tojō Rekishikan, 28 April- 21 June 1998.
The special exhibition commemorating the 200th birthday anniversary of Kichizaemon : Ukai Kichizaemon Kōkichi to bakumatsu. (1998) Bisai : Museum of History and Anthropology (aka Bisaishi Rekishi Minzoku Shiryōkan) (ed).  - Exhibition catalog no.51. 
 Bakumatsu Nihon to Tokugawa Nariaki: Heisei 20-nendo tokubetsuten. (2008) Ibaraki Kenritsu Rekishikan (ed). Mito, Ibaraki: Ibaraki Prefectural Museum of History.

Footnotes

References

Sources 
 
 
   Japanese binding

 
 
  
 
  - Special exhibition on the residences of Akitake and Yoshinobu.

1893 deaths
1804 births
Arisugawa-no-miya
Japanese princesses
People of Edo-period Japan
Tokugawa Yoshinobu family
Mito Domain
People from Kyoto